The 1983 UTEP Miners football team was an American football team that represented the University of Texas at El Paso in the Western Athletic Conference during the 1983 NCAA Division I-A football season. In their second year under head coach Bill Yung, the team compiled a 2–10 record.

Schedule

References

UTEP
UTEP Miners football seasons
UTEP Miners football